The Band of the Coldstream Guards is one of the oldest and best known bands in the British Army, having been officially formed on 16 May 1785 under the command of Major C F Eley.

History
The band of the Coldstream Guards was officially formed under the direction of Music Major C.F. Eley on 16 May 1785.

The band received its first British bandmaster in 1835, Charles Godfrey.

On 18 June 1944 over one hundred twenty people were killed at Wellington Barracks when a German flying bomb hit the chapel. The director of the band was amongst the dead, prompting the appointment of Captain Douglas Alexander Pope.

In 1985, during the band's two hundredth anniversary year, the Coldstream Guards kicked off the Live Aid concert at Wembley Stadium, performing "a fanfare composed by the Director of Music Lt Col Richard Ridings".

Two especially unusual performances took place in the immediate aftermath of the September 11 attacks in the United States. On September 12, 2001, Queen Elizabeth II broke with tradition and allowed the Coldstream Guards Band to perform The Star-Spangled Banner at Buckingham Palace, London, during the daily ceremonial Changing of the Guard. The following day at a St. Paul's Cathedral memorial service, the Queen herself joined in the singing of the American national anthem, an unprecedented occurrence.

Ensembles 
There are several ensembles within the Band of the Coldstream Guards:
 Concert Band
 Marching Band
 Brass Quintet
 Jazz Trio
 Fanfares 

 Woodwind Quintet
 18th Century Band

Events 

The Coldstream Guards Band plays regularly for ceremonial occasions and events. Some are listed below but this is not a comprehensive list.
 Changing of the Guard
 The Festival of Remembrance
 Trooping of the Colour
 Beating the Retreat

The band also performs at other non-military events in the same way as other military bands such as the Grenadier Guards Band or other civilian professional organisations.

Key personnel 
 Director of Music: Major Stewart Halliday
 Band Sergeant Major: Warrant Officer Class 2 Glen Little
 Bandmaster: Warrant Officer Class 2 Simon Lindley

Album and Record Deal

In June 2009 the band signed a record deal with Universal Music imprint Decca, reportedly worth £1 million. Their debut album 'Heroes' was released on 30 November 2009 and was nominated for Best Album of the Year for Classical Brits. The Band of the Coldstream Guards performed at the Classical Brits Awards gala at the Royal Albert Hall.

In media 
In the closing credits of Dad's Army, the band played a instrumental march version of the theme tune, Who Do You Think You Are Kidding, Mr Hitler?, conducted by Captain (later Lieutenant Colonel) Trevor L. Sharpe.

See also 
 Grenadier Guards Band
 Irish Guards Band
 Scots Guards Band
 Welsh Guards Band
 Household Division

References

External links 
 Home of Coldstream Guards Band
 Band History 
 Former personnel website
 

British ceremonial units
Royal Corps of Army Music
1785 establishments in Great Britain
Coldstream Guards